George Issenhuth (1862–1941) was an American architect based in South Dakota.  He designed several buildings which have been listed on the National Register of Historic Places (NRHP).

He practiced as an architect in Huron, South Dakota actively from about 1906 to 1933, designing at least 58 schools in South Dakota and many churches, houses, and commercial buildings including banks.  He designed the Brookings City Hall and state fairgrounds buildings.

Works include:
Arlington Masonic Temple (1907–08), S. Main Street, Arlington, South Dakota, NRHP-listed
Ellendale Opera House Block (1908), 105-111 Main St., Ellendale, North Dakota, NRHP-listed
Brookings City Hall (1912), 4th St. Brookings, South Dakota, NRHP-listed
Canton Carnegie Library (1913), Canton, South Dakota, NRHP-listed
Dairy Building (1913), off Third St. near the South Dakota State Fair Grounds, Huron, South Dakota, NRHP-listed

References

Architects from South Dakota
20th-century American architects
1862 births
1941 deaths